Merrilee K. Fullerton  is a Canadian politician and physician who is the Ontario Minister of Children, Community and Social Service since June 18, 2021. She represents the riding of Kanata-Carleton in the Legislative Assembly of Ontario as a member of the Progressive Conservative Party since 2018.

Fullerton served as Minister of Training, Colleges, and Universities from 2018 to 2019 and the Minister of Long-Term Care from 2019 to 2021. On June 18, 2021 she was shuffled from the Minister of Long-Term Care to the Minister of Children, Community and Social Services.

Early life and education
Fullerton was born in Whitehorse, Yukon and grew up in the Beaverbrook neighbourhood of Kanata, Ontario. She is a graduate of the University of Ottawa's medical school.

Career

Medical career
Fullerton initially practiced from the Carleton Place and District Hospital before going into private practice as a family physician in the Ottawa area. She practiced medicine in Ontario for more than 30 years, and also spent time in Alberta during her medical training. She first practiced out of the Carleton Place Hospital, before opening a practice as a family physician at Med-Team Clinic in Kanata.

Fullerton is a former president of the Academy of Medicine Ottawa and served as a member of the Health Professionals Advisory Committee of the Champlain Local Health Integration Network.  She was selected as a City of Ottawa Board of Health member for a four-year term which ended in 2014. She was also a member of The Ottawa Hospital’s Community Advisory Committee from 2008 to 2010.

Fullerton was a representative on the Ontario Medical Association Council as well as a delegate to the Canadian Medical Association Council. In those roles, she brought forward concepts regarding the sustainability of Canada’s healthcare system, health human-resource planning, social determinants of health,  and virtual care, including mHealth, also known as "mobile health". Most recently, Fullerton assisted in creating and delivering a leadership program for women physicians. She has advocated for a hybrid public healthcare system in Canada.

The College of Physicians and Surgeons of Ontario website indicates that her licence expired in 2014 when she resigned from membership.

Columnist
Fullerton wrote a number of columns in the Ottawa Citizen from 2004 to 2007. Her columns were on a variety of information related to general health and the healthcare system. She also ran a medical blog on her website.

Political career
Fullerton entered provincial politics in 2016, declaring her intention to run against then-Progressive Conservative MPP Jack MacLaren in Kanata-Carleton. MacLaren caused and encountered a number of issues around this time. On May 28, 2017, MacLaren was kicked out of the Ontario PC caucus and barred from being a candidate in the 2018 election, leading to a two-way race between Fullerton and Police Sergeant Rick Keindel. Fullerton won the nomination.

Fullerton came under fire during the 2018 campaign for her tweets, which were labelled Islamophobic by the Canadian Muslim Public Affairs Committee, as well as for blocking Muslim leaders in her community on Twitter. She was also accused of being in favour of a two-tier healthcare system, a claim which she disputes.

COVID 19 Response

In May 2021 Fullerton was widely condemned for her pandemic response as Minister of Long-Term Care and came under fire for dodging questions to do with reports that had recently been released on the showing that the Ontario Conservative government had acted slowly to the pandemic in LTC and that dozens of patients had died of neglect in privately run long term care homes that Fullerton oversaw.

Electoral record

Cabinet posts

References

External links

Members of the Executive Council of Ontario
Progressive Conservative Party of Ontario MPPs
21st-century Canadian politicians
21st-century Canadian women politicians
Women government ministers of Canada
Women MPPs in Ontario
University of Ottawa alumni
Politicians from Whitehorse
Politicians from Ottawa
Year of birth missing (living people)